Nooij is a surname. Notable people with the surname include:

Bas Nooij (born 1987), Dutch baseball player
Mart Nooij (born 1954), Dutch football manager
Tineke de Nooij (born 1941), Dutch radio and television presenter

Dutch-language surnames